Ovidijus Vyšniauskas (born 19 March 1957, in Marijampolė) is a Lithuanian musician from Marijampolė city.

He entered the 1994 Eurovision Song Contest in Dublin with Lithuania's first entry, the ballad "Lopšinė mylimai" (Sweetheart's Lullaby), which did not receive any points. He remains the only Lithuanian internally selected.

References

1957 births
Living people
Eurovision Song Contest entrants of 1994
Eurovision Song Contest entrants for Lithuania
20th-century Lithuanian male singers
People from Marijampolė
Musicians from Kaunas